Osvaldo Daniel Batocletti Ronco (January 22, 1950 – May 17, 2019), known by audience and fans as Bato, was an Argentine football manager and player, who played as a defender. Batocletti coached Tigres UANL and Querétaro F.C.

He resided in Mexico from 1974–2019 and held Mexican citizenship.

He died on May 17, 2019 from cancer.

Career

Player
Batocletti started his career playing with Racing Club de Avellaneda in 1970. In 1973, he moved to Club Atlético Lanús, and then in 1974 he moved to Unión de Santa Fe.

In 1974, he moved to Mexico to play with Club León of the Mexican Primera División, now Liga MX. In 1977, he was transferred to Tigres de la UANL. For his transfer to Tigres, Batocletti sacrificed part of his salary so that Tigres could pay León. With Tigres, he scored 12 goals and was League champion twice, in 1978 and in 1982. Along with Gerónimo Barbadillo, Tomás Boy and coach Carlos Miloc, he is considered an icon of Tigres' first golden age of success. After playing 7 seasons with Tigres, he retired as a player in 1984.

Since retirement, he was attached to Tigres, mostly in administrative positions. He was labeled by Monterrey daily, El Norte, as the "El Tigre más Tigre" (most Tiger of all Tigers), because his extensive career with Tigres and his affection to the team.

Coach
As a coach of Tigres UANL, in quarter-finals of play-offs of the Apertura 2005 season, Tigres played the historical "Aztecazo", a way to describe a difficult victory over Club América or the Mexico national football team in their venue, the Estadio Azteca. In the first game, Tigres lost in the Estadio Universitario by a 1–3 score. Against all odds, however, they defeated América in the second game 4–1 for an aggregate scoreline of 5–4, leaving América out of the postseason. In the semi-finals, Tigres drew rival CF Monterrey after 1–0 and 1–2 (2–2) scorelines, although Monterrey progressed to the next round because of the points in the tournament. Batocletti also coached Querétaro F.C. without success. He also coached the female section of Tigres UANL where he led them to the Clausura 2018 title.

Honours

Player
UANL
Mexican Primera División: 1977–78, 1981–82

Manager
UANL Women
Liga MX Femenil: Clausura 2018

References

Sources
 This article relies heavily on an article published by El Norte on 19 April 2007. El Tigre más Tigre

External links

1950 births
2019 deaths
People from San Nicolás de los Arroyos
Argentine footballers
Argentine expatriate footballers
Expatriate footballers in Mexico
Argentine expatriate sportspeople in Mexico
Argentine emigrants to Mexico
Argentine Primera División players
Association football defenders
Club Atlético Lanús footballers
Club León footballers
Footballers at the 1971 Pan American Games
Deaths from cancer in Mexico
Irapuato F.C. managers
Liga MX Femenil managers
Liga MX players
Mexican footballers
Mexican football managers
Naturalized citizens of Mexico
Pan American Games medalists in football
Pan American Games gold medalists for Argentina
Querétaro F.C. managers
Racing Club de Avellaneda footballers
Tigres UANL footballers
Tigres UANL managers
Unión de Santa Fe footballers
Medalists at the 1971 Pan American Games
Sportspeople from Buenos Aires Province